Narayan Vaman Tilak (6 December 1861 – 9 May 1919) was a Marathi poet from the Konkan region of then Bombay Presidency in British India, and a famous convert to Christianity from Chitpavan Brahmin Community.

Life

Narayan Tilak was born into a Kokanastha Hindu family on 6 December 1861 in the village of Karajhgaon in Ratnagiri District of Bombay Presidency. On 9 May 1919 he died at J.J. Hospital, Byculla, Mumbai.

Tilak's growth and development as a Hindu born in colonial India was entirely along traditional HIndu religious and social lines.  He was a close relative of Lokmanya Bal Gangadhar Tilak. (See Devdatt Narayan Tilak's booklet which consists of a report on the celebration of Tilak's birth centenary).  Unlike many of his Chitpavan Hindu caste fellows, (such as Mahadev Govind Ranade, Lokmanya Tilak, Gopal Krishna Gokhale) who made a name in 19th century Maharashtra after going to college in Pune and after that to England for higher studies in economics, and law, for example, Narayan Tilak never left India's shores for his entire life. His mind was not formed by studies of Western thinkers in academic circles that were shaped by western education in British India, but he read widely and thought deeply on matters of moment for his people in a colonial situation.

At some point, not long after marriage, he left his very young wife Laxmi with her in-laws and went on his quest for answers to deep questions.  Later, in his twenties, he left Laxmi in the care of his father and took off in part for employment, and in part on same persistent spiritual quest.  He actually tried a couple times to take sannyasa as a renunciate, but was rejected when his gurus found out that he was married and sent back to care for his family.  He even went on a padayatra (pilgrimage on foot) to northern India as far as Delhi and western India as far as Dwarka.  His goal may have seemed religious, but in fact he undertook this purposeful wandering principally out of a spirit of deshseva, namely, to serve his countrymen and especially women whose conditions struck him as oppressive and greatly in need of amelioration educationally, religiously, culturally, and socially.  He made his own inquiries into Buddhism and Islam.  Eventually, under the powerful influence of the Hindu monotheistic associations of the past several decades, particularly of the Prarthana Samaj and the Arya Samaj, he formulated five principles on which to found a new religion that was geared to emancipate his people.  What pained him most seems to have been two urgent issues.

Probably because Narayan saw the intolerable situation of his own beloved mother, who was killed by his overbearing and heartless father, as well as that of Narayan's older sister Sakhu who had been married off by his orthodox Hindu father as a mere child, the first burning issue was that of women's distress and suffering under an ironclad and religiously sanctioned patriarchy, severe lack of opportunity for women's education and emancipation, and inhumane practices relating to child marriage, child widows, and marriage of poor and sometimes pre-pubescent young girls to rich widowed men, at times in their dotage, for example. (See Uma Chakravarti, "Rewriting History: The Life and Times of Pandita Ramabai" 1998). The second burning issue was that of casteism, a plague on Indian society, especially in Maharashtra.  Tilak came from privileged stock, and Chitpavan brahmin males such as himself, were the blue eyed boys of Maharashtrian society.  He saw the desperate and widespread situation in which there was no way out for those born into lower castes and who structurally served at the whim and fancy of caste-Hindu society, especially the brahmins (aka bhatjis) and banias (landed and moneyed trader caste which had profited from unprincipled moneylending).

Tilak, like other reform minded elite Hindus, was certainly aware of the writings and practices of Jotiba Phule, perhaps the most radical Hindu reformer of 19th century Maharashtra, who had done pioneering work for the emancipation and amelioration of the conditions of women and shudras in Pune and elsewhere in Maharashtra.  Phule, a non-brahmin of the Mali caste had been educated by Scottish missionaries, but never converted to Christianity.  Tilak, on the other hand, as a brahmin traumatized by his father's abusive treatment of his mother and himself, and as one who had delved deep into the treasure troves of Hindu religion, as well as of Marathi and Sanskrit literatures, seems to have been more moderate and liberal in his outlook, and considered religious and social reform as a promising way to emancipate women and "shudras" in Maharashtra.  But nobody anticipated that the talented Pandit Narayan Vaman Tilak, Hindu patriot and sudharak in his own right, might unthinkably take the dread step of conversion to Christianity.  The underlying assumption of many most Hindu elites at that time was the religious conversion was tantamount to treachery toward Hindu religion and society. Such treachery had severe sanctions and there was no possibility for a converted caste Hindu could be received back into caste. Tilak spurned all attempts of relatives, friends, and would be benefactors to bribe him with money and a regular salary for life, for example. But Tilak rejected all offers. 

Tilak tried to get Laxmi to join him and waited for many long months for her to pluck up courage and join him.  She seemed to agree with him intellectually and spiritually, but balked at the last moment.  The intricately woven networks of religious, family, caste, and village ties were simply too strong to ignore.  With the tremendous urgency of conversion creating mounting pressure on him, and with his health beginning to show signs of deterioration, Narayan Vaman Tilak did the unthinkable.  After four months of instruction by his spiritual father Rev. Justin E. Abbott, on 10 February 1895, at age 34, Narayan Tilak was baptized in the Bhendi Bazaar Chapel (Bhajanalay) of the American Marathi Mission, in Byculla, Mumbai and taught for a year at Hume High School, Byculla.  Significantly, Tilak chose to be baptized neither at the hands of Rev. Abbott, his religious instructor, nor by any of the caste Hindu converts in the Mission, not even by Baba Padmanji, one of the famous well published ordained converts whose book Arunodaya (Sunrise), Tilak had read at least six times when he was internally debating and vacillating because of Laxmi's decision not to follow her seemingly foolhardy husband.  Tilak deliberately chose a former untouchable Rev. Tukaram Nathoji, then Marathi editor of the Dnyanodaya to do the honors.  This was a symbolic choice.  Tilak was going to follow his divine teacher's example in self-emptying.  He was not accepting Christianity as a gesture of a colonized subject.  Not for him a foreigner as the officiant nor a symbol of privileged caste-Hindu patriarchy, but an accomplished writer and editor of formerly untouchable stock—the last would be first.

Tilak's baptism proved to be a sensational event and multitudes of his Hindu followers were scandalized.  He was already highly respected as a poet, teacher, published writer, fervent and enlightened Hindu patriot and social reformer, and a dynamic spiritual leader.  He was very sympathetic to the Prarthana Samaj, a monotheistic association dedicated to modernizing Hindu religion and society by jettisoning what seemed to be untenable intertwined Hindu concepts and doctrines such as karma (deeds) and punarjanma (rebirths).    Knowing that he was contemplating Christian conversion, his relatives, friends, and admirers tried their level best to persuade him to change his mind.  But he deeply disappointed them all.  As payback, two attempts were made on the recent convert's life, but he miraculously escaped.  Unable to cope with the principal of Hume High School, Rev. Edward Sackett Hume's strict western-style discipline, he moved to Ahmednagar, a major center of the American Marathi Mission, at the invitation of Rev. Robert Allen Hume, who was dean of the Theological Seminary.  There Tilak reinvented himself and also began to reinterpret the colonial Mission itself.

Besides doing rural pastoral work, Tilak played a key role in the transformation of its prime Christian beneficiaries, who were primarily the rural poor and former Untouchables of the Mahar and Mang castes.  Due to his ostracism from caste, Narayan Tilak was cut off from his beloved wife Laxmi, age 27, and little son Dattu, age 3 and one-half.  He made many efforts to have them rejoin him, even if it might be as Hindus, and finally, after 4 and one-half years, he succeeded.  After going through various phases of keeping her distance from her reunited husband and his "untouchable" people, she finally opted to be baptized along with her son in 1900 at Rahuri.

Given Tilak's untraditional practices as a dedicated rural catechist, under Rev. Hume's advisement, the American Marathi Mission decided to ordain Tilak on 10 February 1904 at Rahuri.  In 1912, after Tilak had made a name for himself from the 1890s as one of the leading modern Marathi poets and men of letters among the Marathi intelligentsia of the Bombay Presidency, he accepted the position of Marathi editor of the bilingual Protestant weekly Dnyanodaya.  Indeed, Tilak was recipient of a gold medal for his poetry.  From his Hindu years, he composed kirtans (musical religious services with a mixture of poetry and dramatic retelling of Hindu stories of religious inspiration, along with humor and vigorous community participation) and was so popular, he even trained others to professionally conduct kirtans.  This continued into his Christian years when he led kirtans, trained Christian kirtankars, including his wife Laxmi, and published a little handbook Kirtan Kalap as a guide. From 1895 for nearly fifteen years, Tilak published innumerable poems and articles for children on topics suited to a child's mind in the Balbodhmeva, an entertaining educational monthly run by the American Marathi Mission dedicated to children. He wrote voluminously in prose and verse and, due to the Romantic stamp of his secular poetry, was deemed the "Christian Wordsworth of Maharashtra."  Owing to the very many hundred of devotional hymns which Rev. Tilak composed for church worship and for singing in villages, others saw him as the "Tagore of Western India." (See Nazareth, "Rev. Narayan Vaman Tilak: An Interreligious Exploration," 1998, chapter 3 and Appendix).

From 1869–1873, he studied elementary school in the town of Kalyan near Mumbai, and for the next two years (1874–76), studied primarily Sanskrit and Marathi literature, especially poetry, under Ganeshshastri Lele in Bhatjicha Math, Nashik. Then, after two years (1877–79) at the Nashik High School, learning English and other school subjects, before completing his matriculation examination, he terminated his studies, undertaking a modest job as a teacher to support himself some of his siblings and relatives. In 1880, at age 18, his marriage was arranged by his family with Manakaranika Gokhale (मनकर्णिका गोखले), age 11, in accord with the social customs of his times. After the marriage Manakarnika was given the name Laxmibai. She had no formal schooling; however, through Tilak's encouragement, she learned to read and write Marathi, mastering the language to the extent of later composing poems and, after her husband's death, writing her autobiography, Smruti Chitre (स्मृतिचित्रे), which turned out to be an all time autobiographical masterpiece in Marathi literature.  It is an excellent source to understand the lives and personalities of both Narayan Tilak and Laxmi both before and after their conversion to Christianity in the American Marathi Mission.  For example, after marriage, Narayan lived with his in-laws.  Laxmi described how he would disappear at night to watch and participate in Dashavatari plays in the neighboring village of Gangapur and return in the wee hours of the morning.  His talent for acting in diverse roles did not fail to catch the attention of the villagers.  Rumors of his acting and singing and compositions reached his brother-in-law who went and ascertained for himself the truth. Indeed, Narayan was a gifted actor and poet.  (See Smruti Chitre, Part 1)

Narayan (aka Nana) Tilak was a seeker.  As a child, he was strongly influenced by the religiosity of his mother Jankibai and his maternal grandfather who sang to little Narayan the songs of the Saint-poets of Maharashtra such as Dnyaneshvar, Namdev, Eknath, Tukaram, and Ramdas.  So much have the poetry and devotional practices of Narayan Tilak, both in his Hindu and Christian years, been influenced especially by the saint-poets especially of the Varkari Sampraday, that Tilak has sometimes been deemed the "last of the saint-poets of Maharashtra."  He has also been called the "Tukaram of Maharashtra."

The earliest influences on Nana's great love and gifts for poetry and spirituality were his beautiful natural surroundings in the Konkan region of his infancy and childhood, and the spiritual and poetic gifts of his mother whom he loved dearly.  Nana did not benefit from his father Vaman's love and attention.  Vaman, in fact, generally hated and abused the lad and showed his disdain openly.  Nana twice ran away from home, the latter time being immediately after Janki was mortally wounded by a kick from her husband to whom she had always been devoted.  Nana was witness to his father's cruel act.  After a few days of attending to his mother, he watched her die. Then he waited for her cremation rites at the sacred pilgrimage center of Tryambakeshwar, after which Nana left his father and his family for good.  He walked the twelve miles from Tryambak to Nashik.  He was sitting on the banks of the Godavari contemplating his next move, when a local boy befriended him and brought him to his mother Yesubai Mayle.  Without a fuss, the good woman welcomed her son's newfound homeless friend into her home and arranged for his food with local brahmin families as he went to study at Bhatjicha Math.  His budding talent for poetry and elocution soon earned him fame in his mid-teens as well as the nickname "Maharashtra-kokil" (the sweet singing cuckoo of Maharashtra).

Tilak undertook a variety of modest jobs in different towns in Maharashtra at different times in his life, including the job of a teacher, a Hindu priest, and a printing press compositor.  He was not stable in holding on to a job too long because his temperament as a seeker impelled him to search for guidance and role models in gurus (spiritual teachers), of whom there were at least three.  He also As a poet, he was an improvisatore, and would earn more than pocket change for publishing poetry.

In 1891, he got a job in Nagpur as a translator of Sanskrit literature, both philosophical and religious. (He himself wrote and published poems in Marathi and Sanskrit from his years in Nashik and won many prizes in Maharashtrian cities for elocution.) Under the patronage of Appasaheb Buti, he edited for a short while a Marathi magazine named Rushi (ऋषि), which was aimed at interpretation and discussion of Hindu religious matters.  Tilak was proud of his Hindu heritage and leaned strongly toward Hindu social and religious reform as a sudharak (reformer). He never went to college, but taught himself English by memorizing much of an English dictionary.

In 1893, Tilak was travelling by train from Nagpur to Rajnandgaon, a princely state ruled by a Hindu priest, and located within the then Central Provinces of India, in search of employment. During this journey, he met a Protestant missionary Ernest Ward of the Free Methodist Church who spoke glowingly of Christianity, presented a copy of the Bible to Tilak, and suggested that Tilak would become a Christian within two years.

Tilak's journey to Christianity was painful as he understood the reactions that would follow conversion. He anonymously corresponded with a missionary magazine and after confirmation through a series of dreams decided to be baptized. His baptism in Mumbai on 10 February 1895 was done without the knowledge of his relatives, including his wife. Lakshmibai's ordeal is a remarkable story, as she was separated from Tilak for over 4 years before rejoining him, making a radical break with caste, and then embracing discipleship to Jesus.

Tilak immediately began teaching in the seminary in Ahmadnagar and was ordained as a minister in the Congregational church in 1904. He became editor of (and frequent contributor to) the Marathi section of the missionary magazine Dnyanodaya in 1912, a position he held until his death. After about ten years as a Christian he began expressing his faith in local idioms, particularly the poetic style of the Varkari Hindu sampradaya of Maharashtra. The many songs he composed remain very popular among Marathi speaking Christians. But Tilak was a critic of traditional Christianity, and for the last two years of his life moved beyond the church to focus on developing a new brotherhood of baptized and unbaptized disciples of Jesus. This new approach never took root due to Tilak's early death in Mumbai on 9 May 1919.

Tilak's son, Devdatt Narayan Tilak, edited and published the epic poem Christayana. Tilak's grandson, Ashok Devdatt Tilak, was an accomplished historian who edited a critical edition of Smruti Chitre (स्मृतिचित्रे) and wrote a biographical novel about Tilak (चालता बोलता चमत्कार, Chalta Bolta Chamatkar) among other works.

Writer and poet
Tilak composed over a hundred Christian devotional songs in Marathi in either abhanga (अभंग) or ovi (ओवी) form. They were published in a book titled "Abhanganjali" (अभंगांजली). He also commenced in 1909 composition of epical Khristayan (ख्रिस्तायन). He composed 10 chapters of it and left it uncompleted at the time of his death; Laxmibai subsequently completed it by adding 64 chapters of her own.

Besides the initial parts of Khristayan (ख्रिस्तायन), Tilak wrote many long poems comprising several hundred lines, each. His over 2,100 poems include:

 Khristayan (ख्रिस्तायन)
 Wanawasi Phool (वनवासी फुल)
 Sushila (सुशीला)
 Majhi Bharya (माझी भार्या)
 Bapache Ashru (बापाचे अश्रू)
 Parwatarohan (पर्वतारोहण)
 Srushtichi Bhaubij (सृष्टीची भाऊबीज)
 Pure Janato Micha Majhe Bala (पुरे जाणतो मीच माझे बळ)
 Ranashing (रणशिंग)
 Majhya Janambhumiche Nav (माझ्या जन्मभूमीचे नाव)
 Priyakar Hindistan (प्रियकर हिंदीस्तान)
 Lekarachi Jidnyasa (लेकराची जिज्ञासा)
 Kawichi Winawani (कवीची विनवणी)
 Kawi (कवि)
 Kevdhe He Krourya (केव्हडे हे क्रौर्य)

Bibliography

Primary Sources
Tilak, Narayan Vaman. "Maza Anubhav." (Steps to Christ). Dnyanodaya 54/11 (Mar. 1895) 2 pp.
Tilak, Narayan Vaman. "Stree" (Woman). Dnyanodaya 54/13 (Mar. 1895) 2 pp.
Tilak, Narayan Vaman. "A Brahman's Idea of Sin." Dnyanodaya 59/23 (Jun. 1900) 1.
Tilak, Narayan Vaman. "Hindus as Givers." Dnyanodaya 59/29 (Jul. 1900) 1.
Tilak, Narayan Vaman. "A Few Thoughts on the Lord's Prayer." Dnyanodaya 66/37, 38, 41, 42, 43, 49 (Sep. Nov. 1907) 6.
Tilak, Narayan Vaman. "The Study of Indian Myths." 71/37 (Sep. 1912) 1.
Tilak, Narayan Vaman. Bhakti-Niranjana.  Nasik, n.d. 160 pp.
Tilak, Narayan Vaman. (Translations of his poems into English, including parts of the Khristayana.)
Tilak, Narayan Vaman. "India's Great Demand." YMI (Jan. 1909) 10.
Tilak, Narayan Vaman. "My Motherland." YMI (Sep. 1917) 513.
Tilak, Narayan Vaman. "No Longer I But Christ." YMI (Apr. 1926) 219.
Tilak, Narayan Vaman. Susila and Other Poems. Calcutta: YMCA, 1926. 60 pp.
Tilak, Narayan Vaman. (Poems in English translation by J.C. Winslow.)
Tilak, Narayan Vaman. Christayan. Tr. into English by J.C. Winslow. CSS Review.
Tilak, Narayan Vaman. Translations in J.C. Winslow, Narayan Vaman Tilak. Calcutta: YMCA, 1923. 137 pp.
Tilak, Narayan Vaman. Loka Bandhu Prabhu Yeshu Khrist. (Jesus the People's Friend, I). [Prose.] Bombay: Bombay Tract Society, 1921. 38 pp.
Tilak, Narayan Vaman, and Tilak, Laksmibai. Khristayana. Nashik: Devadatt Narayan Tilak, 'Shantisadan,' 1938.
Tilak, Narayan Vaman and Laksmibai Tilak. Khristayana. Sanskipta. [= Abridged] Mumbai: Bombay Tract and Book Society, 1959.

Secondary Sources
 J. C. Winslow, Naryana Vamana Tilak. Calcutta: Association Press, 1923.
 Nazareth, Malcolm J., Reverend Narayan Vaman Tilak: An interreligious exploration. Temple University, 1998.
 Patil, Subash, Santa Tukaram ani Rev. Tilak: Ek Bhāvanubandha. Pune: Snehavardhana Publ. House, 2005.
 Richard, H.L., Christ-bhakti: Narayan Vaman Tilak and Christian Work among Hindus. Delhi: ISPCK, 1991.
 Richard, H.L., Following Jesus in the Hindu Context. Revised and expanded. Secunderbad, India: OM Book, 1998.
 Richard, H.L., Following Jesus in the Hindu Context: The intriguing implications of N.V. Tilak’s life and thought. Revised American edition. Pasadena: William Carey Library, 1998.
Sheikh, Mir Isahak, Laksmibai Tilakanchi Smrtichitre: Ek Chintan. Pune: Pratima Prakashan, 2000.
 Tilak, Ashok D., Chalta Bolta Chamatkar. Mumbai: Popular Prakashan, 2005.
 Tilak, Ashok D., Chavaituhi. Nashik: Mukta Ashok Tilak, Shantisadan, 2001.
 Tilak, Ashok D., Sampurna Smruti Chitre. Mumbai: Popular Prakashan, 1989.
 Tilak, Ashok D., Jara Vegala Angle. Nashik: Mayavati Ashok Tilak, 1979.
 Tilak, Ashok D., Takkarmāl. Nashik Road: Vangmayaseva Prakashan, 2006.
 George, Anthony D., Svatantryapurvakalatila Dharmantarita Khristi Vyaktinci Atmanivedane Samajika Ani Vangmayina Abhyasa. Mumbai: Mumbai Vidyapeeth, 2007. [PhD thesis on pre-1947 Marathi converts to Christianity, submitted to Bombay University.]

References

External links
Narayan Waman Tilak materials in the South Asian American Digital Archive (SAADA)

Konkan
Marathi-language writers
Indian Christians
Converts to Protestantism from Hinduism
Konkani people
1861 births
1919 deaths
People from Ratnagiri district